The World Kickboxing Association (WKA) also known as World Kickboxing and Karate Association, is one of the oldest and the largest amateur and professional sanctioning body for kickboxing and Karate.

History
In 1976, the WKA was founded by Howard Hanson in the United States and originally named World Karate Association. The organization was the first non-profit governing body to use an independently controlled rating list and the first to establish a world championship division for women and the first to include countries from Asia. The organization secured network broadcast in the US and Japan and became a major sanctioning body for professional karate. Early stars of the WKA included Benny Urquidez, Don "The Dragon" Wilson, Kevin Rosier and Graciela Casillas. According to martial arts author John Ritschel, "The WKA became successful by finding common ground between Western and Eastern full-contact fighting culture, thereby creating and defining a culture for the sport that improved the recognition of full-contact competitions."

The WKA reported that it had had 52 of its events in televised syndication worldwide in 1981, compared to 48 events broadcast by rival federation PKA (the Professional Karate Association) that year.

The WKA later developed on the European continent with Champions like Rob Kaman and Fred Royers. In 1991, Howard Hanson sold the WKA to Canadian Dale Floyd which was followed by a fade in the organization's North American activities. In 1994, Paul Ingram took over the WKA and established its world headquarters in the UK, which led the appointed European directors Fred Royers from Holland and Jean-Paul Maillet from France to leave in January. At the time, WKA was the second largest professional sanctioning organisation in the World. By 2011, the WKA had 129 offices worldwide and was the best known governing body among the rival federations in kickboxing. In 2013, it had 40 member nations.

In December 2018, David Sawyer based out of New Zealand took over the management of the WKA as president.

The World Kickboxing Association sanctions fights worldwide fought under the WKA ruleset.

From October 31 to November 4, 2022, the organization is set host the 2022 WKA World Championships in North Wales.

 WKU split 

In 2012, the WKA split to the newly founded World Kickboxing and Karate Union (WKUWORLD), whereby the WKA still exists as a splinter association, but has lost much of its former importance. Sponsors such as KWON, which formerly supported the WKA, also moved to the WKUWORLD.

From 29 September 2012 WKA had new management: Michele Panfietti began serving as World President and Cristiano Radicchi began serving as General Secretary. From December 2016, the management was passed back to Mr Paul Ingram, and the WKA headquarters was transferred back to Birmingham, England.

Controversy 
The WKA is one of the main governing bodies who sanctions fights in New Zealand. In 2015, an accident in New Zealand left an athlete in a coma with spinal injuries after falling awkwardly with his opponent during a match.

Ruleset 
Under its professional ruleset it sanctions boxing, full contact karate and kickboxing, low kick, K-1 and GLORY kickboxing, as well as Thai boxing and Muay Thai. 

Using substances banned by one of the appropriate organizations isn't allowed, WKA supervisors, promoters and the official medic can perform tests on the competitors. Failing a test, or failing to provide a sample can result in a two year ban. Tests are performed by a qualified person of the same sex.

Competitions are held inside of a ring not smaller than 20 square feet or larger than 24 square feet, with four ropes surrounding it. Referees judging the bouts must be certified by WKA.

Full contact karate fights consist of two twelve minute rounds for men, and two ten minute rounds for women. European and national title bouts consist of two ten minute rounds for men, and two eight minute rounds for women. All other regional and state fights consist of two eight minute rounds for men and two six minute rounds for women. For boxing and all forms of kickboxing and karate, rounds consist of three three minute rounds for Class B athletes or five three minute rounds for Class A athletes, depending on the experience of the competitors. Class B athletes are those with seven amateur wins. They are promoted to Class A after achieving eight Class B wins. There is always a minute of rest between rounds. Rounds are scored based on eight counts, effective striking, ring control and style specific techniques.

All competitors wear competition appropriate attire, with compulsory groin protectors for men and breast protectors for women, with both additionally having to use a mouth guard. Full contact karate athletes wear foot protectors, with the exception of title bouts, should the champion demand otherwise. 10 oz gloves are used in all divisions, unless fighters up to and including middleweight agree to use 8 oz gloves.

Bouts in which one of the fighters has missed weight are permitted, provided the weight differential doesn't exceed 3.5% of the weight division allowance or 3.5 kg, whichever is less.

Aside from this, WKA also certifies Karate and kickboxing colored belts and black belts, ranging from 1st to 9th Dan for kickboxing or 1st to 10th for Karate.

Weight classes

See also
 Kickboxing
 List of kickboxing organizations
 World Association of Kickboxing Organizations

References

Further reading
Delmas Alain, Callière Jean-Roger, Histoire du Kick-boxing, FKBDA, France, 1998
Delmas Alain, Définition du Kick-boxing, FKBDA, France, 1999

External links
 WKA official site.

Sports organizations established in 1976
WKA
WKA
Organisations based in Auckland